A Sucessora is a Brazilian telenovela written by Manoel Carlos based on the homonym novel published by Carolina Nabuco in 1934. It was aired from 9 October 1978 to 2 March 1979, comprised 125 episodes and starred Suzana Vieira, Rubens de Falco, and Nathalia Timberg.

Synopsis 
The story follows the experiences of protagonist Marina, a young country bumpkin who marries the mysterious and charismatic widower Roberto Stein, a fabulously wealthy businessman living in 1920s Rio de Janeiro. As Marina attempts to acclimate to her new marriage and responsibilities, she discovers that Stein's late wife, Alice, still seems to have a strong hold over the household. Despite her new husband's affection for her, Marina is nonetheless threatened by Alice's presence, which is made conspicuous through her old maid Juliana's obsessions and her intimidating portrait.

Cast

Soundtrack 
 "Ontem ao Luar" - Fafá de Belém
 "Santa Maria" - Hermes Aquino
 "Odeon" - Nara Leão
 "Mal-me-quer" - Maria Creusa
 "Como Se Fosse" - Lucinha Araújo
 "Gadu Namorando" - Os Carioquinhas

References

External links
 

Brazilian telenovelas
1978 telenovelas
TV Globo telenovelas
1978 Brazilian television series debuts
1979 Brazilian television series endings
Portuguese-language telenovelas
Television shows based on Brazilian novels
Television shows set in Rio de Janeiro (city)
Television series set in the 1920s